Anneliese Rubie (born 22 April 1992) is an Australian sprinter. Also known as Anneliese Rubie-Renshaw, she was a semi finalist at the 2016 Rio Olympics, and the 2015 World Championships in Beijing. She also ran in the semi-finals at the 2014 Commonwealth Games in Glasgow. She ran the second leg for the women's 4 × 400 m which made the Olympic final in 2016.

At the 2020 Tokyo Olympics, Rubie was a member of the Australian team that competed in the women's 4 x 400 meter relay. The team of Kendra Hubbard, Ellie Beer and Bendere Oboya finished 7th in their heat and did not contest the final.

Early years 
Rubie did very well as a little athlete. As an 18 year old in 2010 she made the semi-finals at the World Juniors.She made the semi-finals at the World University Games in 2011 and also competed at the senior 2011 World Championships

In 2013, Rubie joined Morgan Mitchell to lead a resurgence in women's 400m and 4x400m running in Australia. At the 2014 Commonwealth Games, the Australian 4x400m team came fourth. In April 2015 Rubie secured an Olympic relay position at the IAAF World Relays in the Bahamas. Individually at 400m, she made the semis at the 2014 Commonwealth Games and the 2015 world championships.

International competitions

1Did not start in the semifinals

2Representing Asia-Pacific

Personal bests
Outdoor
200 metres – 23.40 (+0.7 m/s, Canberra 2018)
400 metres – 51.51 (Gold Coast 2018)
800 metres – 2:02.18 (Los Angeles 2017)

References

External links
 
 Anneliese Rubie at Athletics Australia
 Anneliese Rubie at Australian Athletics Historical Results
 

1992 births
Living people
Australian female sprinters
World Athletics Championships athletes for Australia
Sportspeople from Canberra
Athletes (track and field) at the 2016 Summer Olympics
Olympic athletes of Australia
Athletes (track and field) at the 2018 Commonwealth Games
Commonwealth Games competitors for Australia
Athletes (track and field) at the 2020 Summer Olympics
Olympic female sprinters
21st-century Australian women
20th-century Australian women